Printing is a process for mass reproducing text and images using a master form or template. The earliest non-paper products involving printing include cylinder seals and objects such as the Cyrus Cylinder and the Cylinders of Nabonidus. The earliest known form of printing as applied to paper was woodblock printing, which appeared in China before 220 AD for cloth printing. However, it would not be applied to paper until the seventh century. Later developments in printing technology include the movable type invented by Bi Sheng around 1040 AD and the printing press invented by Johannes Gutenberg in the 15th century. The technology of printing played a key role in the development of the Renaissance and the Scientific Revolution and laid the material basis for the modern knowledge-based economy and the spread of learning to the masses.

History

Woodblock printing

Woodblock printing is a technique for printing text, images or patterns that was used widely throughout East Asia. It originated in China in antiquity as a method of printing on textiles and later on paper. As a method of printing on cloth, the earliest surviving examples from China date to before 220 A.D.

In East Asia

The earliest surviving woodblock printed fragments are from China. They are of silk printed with flowers in three colours from the Han Dynasty (before 220 A.D.). The earliest examples of woodblock printing on paper appear in the mid-seventh century in China.

By the ninth century, printing on paper had taken off, and the first extant complete printed book containing its date is the Diamond Sutra (British Library) of 868.  By the tenth century, 400,000 copies of some sutras and pictures were printed, and the Confucian classics were in print. A skilled printer could print up to 2,000 double-page sheets per day.

Printing spread early to Korea and Japan, which also used Chinese logograms, but the technique was also used in Turpan and Vietnam using a number of other scripts. This technique then spread to Persia and Russia. This technique was transmitted to Europe by around 1400 and was used on paper for old master prints and playing cards.

In Middle East
Block printing, called tarsh in Arabic, developed in Arabic Egypt during the ninth and tenth centuries, mostly for prayers and amulets. There is some evidence to suggest that these print blocks were made from non-wood materials, possibly tin, lead, or clay. The techniques employed are uncertain. Block printing later went out of use during the Timurid Renaissance. The printing technique in Egypt was embraced by reproducing texts on paper strips and supplying them in different copies to meet the demand.

In Europe

Block printing first came to Europe as a method for printing on cloth, where it was common by 1300. Images printed on cloth for religious purposes could be quite large and elaborate. When paper became relatively easily available, around 1400, the technique transferred very quickly to small woodcut religious images and playing cards printed on paper. These prints produced in very large numbers from about 1425 onward.

Around the mid-fifteenth-century, block-books, woodcut books with both text and images, usually carved in the same block, emerged as a cheaper alternative to manuscripts and books printed with movable type. These were all short heavily illustrated works, the bestsellers of the day, repeated in many different block-book versions: the Ars moriendi and the Biblia pauperum were the most common.  There is still some controversy among scholars as to whether their introduction preceded or, the majority view, followed the introduction of movable type, with the range of estimated dates being between about 1440 and 1460.

Movable-type printing

Movable type is the system of printing and typography using movable pieces of metal type, made by casting from matrices struck by letterpunches. Movable type allowed for much more flexible processes than hand copying or block printing.

Around 1040, the first known movable type system was created in China by Bi Sheng out of porcelain. Bi Sheng used clay type, which broke easily, but Wang Zhen by 1298 had carved a more durable type from wood. He also developed a complex system of revolving tables and number-association with written Chinese characters that made typesetting and printing more efficient. Still, the main method in use there remained woodblock printing (xylography), which "proved to be cheaper and more efficient for printing Chinese, with its thousands of characters".

Copper movable type printing originated in China at the beginning of the 12th century. It was used in large-scale printing of paper money
issued by the Northern Song dynasty. Movable type spread to Korea during the Goryeo dynasty.

Around 1230, Koreans invented a metal type movable printing using bronze. The Jikji, published in 1377, is the earliest known metal printed book. Type-casting was used, adapted from the method of casting coins. The character was cut in beech wood, which was then pressed into a soft clay to form a mould, and bronze poured into the mould, and finally the type was polished. Eastern metal movable type was spread to Europe between the late 14th and early 15th centuries. The Korean form of metal movable type was described by the French scholar Henri-Jean Martin as "extremely similar to Gutenberg's".  Authoritative historians Frances Gies and Joseph Gies claimed that "The Asian priority of invention movable type is now firmly established, and that Chinese-Korean technique, or a report of it traveled westward is almost certain."

The printing press

Around 1450, Johannes Gutenberg introduced the first movable type printing system in Europe. He advanced innovations in casting type based on a matrix and hand mould, adaptations to the screw-press, the use of an oil-based ink, and the creation of a softer and more absorbent paper. Gutenberg was the first to create his type pieces from an alloy of lead, tin, antimony, copper and bismuth – the same components still used today. Johannes Gutenberg started work on his printing press around 1436, in partnership with Andreas Dritzehen – whom he had previously instructed in gem-cutting – and Andreas Heilmann, the owner of a paper mill.

Compared to woodblock printing, movable type page setting and printing using a press was faster and more durable. Also, the metal type pieces were sturdier and the lettering more uniform, leading to typography and fonts. The high quality and relatively low price of the Gutenberg Bible (1455) established the superiority of movable type for Western languages. The printing press rapidly spread across Europe, leading up to the Renaissance, and later all around the world.

Time Life magazine called Gutenberg's innovations in movable type printing the most important invention of the second millennium.

Rotary printing press

The rotary printing press was invented by Richard March Hoe in 1843. It uses impressions curved around a cylinder to print on long continuous rolls of paper or other substrates. Rotary drum printing was later significantly improved by William Bullock. There are multiple types of rotary printing press technologies that are still used today: sheetfed offset, rotogravure, and flexographic printing.

Printing capacity 
The table lists the maximum number of pages which various press designs could print per hour.

Conventional printing technology
All printing process are concerned with two kinds of areas on the final output:
 Image area (printing areas)
 Non-image area (non-printing areas)

After the information has been prepared for production (the prepress step), each printing process has definitive means of separating the image from the non-image areas.

Conventional printing has four types of process:
 Planographics, in which the printing and non-printing areas are on the same plane surface and the difference between them is maintained chemically or by physical properties, the examples are: offset lithography, collotype, and screenless printing.
 Relief, in which the printing areas are on a plane surface and the non printing areas are below the surface, examples: flexography and letterpress.
 Intaglio, in which the non-printing areas are on a plane surface and the printing area are etched or engraved below the surface, examples: steel die engraving, gravure, etching, collagraph.
 Porous or Stencil, in which the printing areas are on fine mesh screens through which ink can penetrate, and the non-printing areas are a stencil over the screen to block the flow of ink in those areas, examples: screen printing, stencil duplicator, risograph.

Crop marks
To print an image without a blank area around the image, the non-printing areas must be trimmed after printing.  Crop marks can be used to show the printer where the printing area ends, and the non-printing area begins.  The part of the image which is trimmed off is called bleed.

Letterpress

Letterpress printing is a technique of relief printing. A worker composes and locks movable type into the bed of a press, inks it, and presses paper against it to transfer the ink from the type which creates an impression on the paper. 
There is different paper for different works the quality of paper shows different ink to use.

Letterpress printing was the normal form of printing text from its invention by Johannes Gutenberg in the mid-15th century and remained in wide use for books and other uses until the second half of the 20th century, when offset printing was developed. More recently, letterpress printing has seen a revival in an artisanal form.

Offset

Offset printing is a widely used modern printing process. This technology is best described as when a positive (right-reading) image on a printing plate is inked and transferred (or "offset") from the plate to a rubber blanket. The blanket image becomes a mirror image of the plate image. An offset transfer moves the image to a printing substrate (typically paper), making the image right-reading again. Offset printing uses a lithographic process which is based on the repulsion of oil and water. The offset process employs a flat (planographic) image carrier (plate) which is mounted on a press cylinder. The image to be printed obtains ink from ink rollers, while the non-printing area attracts an (acidic) film of water, keeping the non-image areas ink-free. Most offset presses use three cylinders: Plate, blanket, impression. Currently, most books and newspapers are printed using offset lithography.

Gravure

Gravure printing is an intaglio printing technique, where the image being printed is made up of small depressions in the surface of the printing plate. The cells are filled with ink, and the excess is scraped off the surface with a doctor blade. Then a rubber-covered roller presses paper onto the surface of the plate and into contact with the ink in the cells. The printing cylinders are usually made from copper plated steel, which is subsequently chromed, and may be produced by diamond engraving; etching, or laser ablation.

Gravure printing is known for its ability to produce high-quality, high-resolution images with accurate color reproduction and using viscosity control equipment during production.
Ink evaporation control Affects the change in the color of the printed image.

Gravure printing is used for long, high-quality print runs such as magazines, mail-order catalogues, packaging and printing onto fabric and wallpaper. It is also used for printing postage stamps and decorative plastic laminates, such as kitchen worktops.

Flexography
Flexography is a type of relief printing. The relief plates are typically made from photopolymers.
The process is used for flexible packaging, corrugated board, labels, newspapers and more. In this market it competes with gravure printing by holding 80% of the market in USA, 50% in Europe but only 20% in Asia.

Other printing techniques
The other significant printing techniques include:
 Dye-sublimation printer
 Inkjet, used typically to print a small number of books or packaging, and also to print a variety of materials: from high quality papers simulating offset printing, to floor tiles. Inkjet is also used to apply mailing addresses to direct mail pieces
 Laser printing (toner printing) mainly used in offices and for transactional printing (bills, bank documents). Laser printing is commonly used by direct mail companies to create variable data letters or coupons.
 Pad printing, popular for its ability to print on complex three-dimensional surfaces
 Relief print, mainly used for catalogues
 Screen printing for a variety of applications ranging from T-shirts to floor tiles, and on uneven surfaces
 Intaglio, used mainly for high value documents such as currencies.
 Thermal printing, popular in the 1990s for fax printing. Used today for printing labels such as airline baggage tags and individual price labels in supermarket deli counters.

Impact of German movable type printing press

Quantitative aspects

It is estimated that following the innovation of Gutenberg's printing press, the European book output rose from a few million to around one billion copies within a span of less than four centuries.

Religious impact
Samuel Hartlib, who was exiled in Britain and enthusiastic about social and cultural reforms, wrote in 1641 that "the art of printing will so spread knowledge that the common people, knowing their own rights and liberties, will not be governed by way of oppression".

In the Muslim world, printing, especially in Arabic scripts, was strongly opposed throughout the early modern period, partially due to the high artistic renown of the art of traditional calligraphy. However, printing in Hebrew or Armenian script was often permitted.  Thus, the first movable type printing in the Ottoman Empire was in Hebrew in 1493, after which both religious and non-religious texts were able to be printed in Hebrew.  According to an imperial ambassador to Istanbul in the middle of the sixteenth century, it was a sin for the Turks, particularly Turkish Muslims, to print religious books. In 1515, Sultan Selim I issued a decree under which the practice of printing would be punishable by death. At the end of the sixteenth century, Sultan Murad III permitted the sale of non-religious printed books in Arabic characters, yet the majority were imported from Italy. Ibrahim Muteferrika established the first press for printing in Arabic in the Ottoman Empire, against opposition from the calligraphers and parts of the Ulama. It operated until 1742, producing altogether seventeen works, all of which were concerned with non-religious, utilitarian matters.  Printing did not become common in the Islamic world until the 19th century.

Hebrew language printers were banned from printing guilds in some Germanic states; as a result, Hebrew printing flourished in Italy, beginning in 1470 in Rome, then spreading to other cities including Bari, Pisa, Livorno, and Mantua. Local rulers had the authority to grant or revoke licenses to publish Hebrew books, and many of those printed during this period carry the words 'con licenza de superiori' (indicating their printing having been officially licensed) on their title pages.

It was thought that the introduction of printing 'would strengthen religion and enhance the power of monarchs.' The majority of books were of a religious nature, with the church and crown regulating the content. The consequences of printing 'wrong' material were extreme. Meyrowitz used the example of William Carter who in 1584 printed a pro-Catholic pamphlet in Protestant-dominated England. The consequence of his action was hanging.

Social impact
Print gave a broader range of readers access to knowledge and enabled later generations to build directly on the intellectual achievements of earlier ones without the changes arising within verbal traditions. Print, according to Acton in his 1895 lecture On the Study of History, gave "assurance that the work of the Renaissance would last, that what was written would be accessible to all, that such an occultation of knowledge and ideas as had depressed the Middle Ages would never recur, that not an idea would be lost".

Print was instrumental in changing the social nature of reading.

Elizabeth Eisenstein identifies two long-term effects of the invention of printing. She claims that print created a sustained and uniform reference for knowledge and allowed comparisons of incompatible views.

Asa Briggs and Peter Burke identify five kinds of reading that developed in relation to the introduction of print:
 Critical reading: Because texts finally became accessible to the general population, critical reading emerged as people were able to form their own opinions on texts.
 Dangerous reading: Reading was seen as a dangerous pursuit because it was considered rebellious and unsociable, especially in the case of women, because reading could stir up dangerous emotions such as love, and if women could read, they could read love notes.
 Creative reading: Printing allowed people to read texts and interpret them creatively, often in very different ways than the author intended.
 Extensive reading: Once print made a wide range of texts available, earlier habits of intensive reading of texts from start to finish began to change, and people began reading selected excerpts, allowing much more extensive reading on a wider range of topics.
 Private reading: Reading was linked to the rise of individualism because, before print, reading was often a group event in which one person would read to a group. With print, both literacy and the availability of texts increased, and solitary reading became the norm.

The invention of printing also changed the occupational structure of European cities. Printers emerged as a new group of artisans for whom literacy was essential, while the much more labour-intensive occupation of the scribe naturally declined. Proof-correcting arose as a new occupation, while a rise in the numbers of booksellers and librarians naturally followed the explosion in the numbers of books.

Educational impact 
Gutenberg's printing press had profound impacts on universities as well. Universities were influenced in their "language of scholarship, libraries, curriculum, [and] pedagogy"

The language of scholarship 
Before the invention of the printing press, most written material was in Latin. However, after the invention of printing the number of books printed expanded as well as the vernacular. Latin was not replaced completely, but remained an international language until the eighteenth century.

University libraries 
At this time, universities began establishing accompanying libraries. "Cambridge made the chaplain responsible for the library in the fifteenth century but this position was abolished in 1570 and in 1577 Cambridge established the new office of university librarian. Although, the University of Leuven did not see a need for a university library based on the idea that professor were the library. Libraries also began receiving so many books from gifts and purchases that they began to run out of room. However, the issue was solved in 1589 by a man named Merton who decided books should be stored on horizontal shelves rather than lecterns.

Curriculum 
The printed press changed university libraries in many ways. Professors were finally able to compare the opinions of different authors rather than being forced to look at only one or two specific authors. Textbooks themselves were also being printed in different levels of difficulty, rather than just one introductory text being made available.

Comparison of printing methods

Digital printing

By 2005, digital printing accounted for approximately 9% of the 45 trillion pages printed annually around the world.

Printing at home, an office, or an engineering environment is subdivided into:
 small format (up to ledger size paper sheets), as used in business offices and libraries
 wide format (up to 3' or 914mm wide rolls of paper), as used in drafting and design establishments.

Some of the more common printing technologies are:
 blueprint – and related chemical technologies
 daisy wheel – where pre-formed characters are applied individually
 dot-matrix – which produces arbitrary patterns of dots with an array of printing studs
 line printing – where formed characters are applied to the paper by lines
 heat transfer – such as early fax machines or modern receipt printers that apply heat to special paper, which turns black to form the printed image
 inkjet – including bubble-jet, where ink is sprayed onto the paper to create the desired image
 electrophotography – where toner is attracted to a charged image and then developed
 laser – a type of xerography where the charged image is written pixel by pixel using a laser
 solid ink printer – where solid sticks of ink are melted to make liquid ink or toner

Vendors typically stress the total cost to operate the equipment, involving complex calculations that include all cost factors involved in the operation as well as the capital equipment costs, amortization, etc. For the most part, toner systems are more economical than inkjet in the long run, even though inkjets are less expensive in the initial purchase price.

Professional digital printing (using toner) primarily uses an electrical charge to transfer toner or liquid ink to the substrate onto which it is printed. Digital print quality has steadily improved from early color and black and white copiers to sophisticated colour digital presses such as the Xerox iGen3, the Kodak Nexpress, the HP Indigo Digital Press series, and the InfoPrint 5000. The iGen3 and Nexpress use toner particles and the Indigo uses liquid ink. The InfoPrint 5000 is a full-color, continuous forms inkjet drop-on-demand printing system. All handle variable data, and rival offset in quality. Digital offset presses are also called direct imaging presses, although these presses can receive computer files and automatically turn them into print-ready plates, they cannot insert variable data.

Small press and fanzines generally use digital printing. Prior to the introduction of cheap photocopying, the use of machines such as the spirit duplicator, hectograph, and mimeograph was common.

3D printing

3D printing is a form of manufacturing technology where physical objects are created from three-dimensional digital models using 3D printers. The objects are created by laying down or building up many thin layers of material in succession. The technique is also known as additive manufacturing, rapid prototyping, or fabricating.

Gang run printing
Gang run printing is a method in which multiple printing projects are placed on a common paper sheet in an effort to reduce printing costs and paper waste. Gang runs are generally used with sheet-fed printing presses and CMYK process color jobs, which require four or eight separate plates that are hung on the plate cylinder of the press.  Printers use the term "gang run" or "gang" to describe the practice of placing many print projects on the same oversized sheet. Basically, instead of running one postcard that is 4 x 6 as an individual job the printer would place 15 different postcards on 20 x 18 sheet, therefore using the same amount of press time the printer will get 15 jobs done in roughly the same amount of time as one job.

Printed electronics
Printed electronics is the manufacturing of electronic devices using standard printing processes. Printed electronics technology can be produced on cheap materials such as paper or flexible film, which makes it an extremely cost-effective method of production. Since early 2010, the printable electronics industry has been gaining momentum and several large companies, including Bemis Company and Illinois Tool Works have made investments in printed electronics and industry associations including OE-A and FlexTech Alliance are contributing heavily to the advancement of the printed electronics industry.

Printing terminologies
Printing terminologies are the specific terms used in the printing industry.

 Airshaft
 Anilox
 Basis weight
 Ben-Day dots
 Bleed (printing)
 Broadsheet
 California Job Case
 Camera-ready
 Card stock
 Catchword
 CcMmYK color model
 CMYK color model
 Colophon (publishing)
 Color bleeding (printing)
 Composing stick
 Computer to film
 Computer to plate
 Continuous tone
 Die (philately)
 Dot gain
 Dots per centimeter
 Dots per inch
 Double truck
 Dry transfer
 Dultgen
 Duotone
 Duplex printing
 Edition (printmaking)
 Error diffusion
 Flong
 Foil stamping
 Folio (printing)
 For position only
 Frisket
 Galley proof
 Gang run printing
 Grammage
 Grey component replacement
 Halftone
 Hand mould
 Hellbox
 Hexachrome
 Hot stamping
 Imposition
 Inkometer
 Iris printer
 Iron-on
 Job Definition Format
 Key plate
 Keyline
 Kodak Proofing Software
 Mezzotint
 Nanotransfer printing
 Non-photo blue
 Overprinting
 Pagination
 Paste up
 Pre-flight (printing)
 Prepress
 Prepress proofing
 Press check (printing)
 Registration black
 Rich black
 Set-off (printing)
 Spot color
 Stochastic screening
 Transfer-print
 Trap (printing)
 Under color removal

See also

 Color printing
 Cloud printing
 Converters (industry)
 Dickerson combination press
 Electrotyping
 Flexography
 In-mould decoration
 In-mould labelling
 Jang Yeong-sil
 Laurens Janszoon Coster
 Letterpress printing
 Music engraving
 Music printing
 Print on demand
 Printed T-shirt
 Printing press check
 Security printing
 Textile printing
 Waterless printing
 Early American publishers and printers

References

Further reading
Barker, Nicholas. (1978). “Invention of Printing.” U.S. Library of Congress Quarterly Journal 35 (March): 64–76. 
 
 Elizabeth L. Eisenstein, The Printing Press as an Agent of Change, Cambridge University Press, September 1980, Paperback, 832 p. 
Egan, Grace, and Colin Johnston. “‘Serving the Turn’: Collaboration and Proof in Illegal Hand-Press Period Books.” Ilha do Desterro 71.2 (2018): 129–152. 
 

Hargrave, J. (2013). Disruptive Technological History: Papermaking to Digital Printing. Journal of Scholarly Publishing, 44(3). 221–227.
 Lafontaine, Gerard S. (1958). Dictionary of Terms Used in the Paper, Printing, and Allied Industries. Toronto: H. Smith Paper Mills. 110 p.
 Marshall McLuhan, The Gutenberg Galaxy: The Making of Typographic Man (1962) Univ. of Toronto Press (1st ed.); reissued by Routledge & Kegan Paul 
 
 
 
 Tam, Pui-Wing The New Paper Trail, The Wall Street Journal Online, February 13, 2006 p. R8
 
 Woong-Jin-Wee-In-Jun-Gi No. 11 Jang Young Sil by Baek Sauk Gi. 1987 Woongjin Publishing Co., Ltd. p. 61.
On the effects of Gutenberg's printing

Early printers manuals
The classic manual of early hand-press technology is
 
A somewhat later one, showing 18th century developments is

External links

 
 
 Prints & People: A Social History of Printed Pictures, an exhibition catalog from The Metropolitan Museum of Art (fully available online as PDF)
 Centre for the History of the Book
 Printing Industries of the Americas – trade association for printers and companies in the graphic arts
 The development of book and printing. English website of the Gutenberg-Museum Mainz (Germany)
 BPSnet British Printing Society
 Taiwan Culture Portal: Ri Xing Type Foundry – preserving the true character of Chinese type
 A collection of printing materials from the 19th Century – Documents printed by R. Mathison Jr., The Job Printer, in Vancouver, B.C. – UBC Library Digital Collections
 International Printing Museum, Carson, CA, Web site
 Museum of Printing, Andover, MA, Web site
 American Printing History Association, NY, Web site
 Hamilton Wood Type and Printing Museum, WI, Web site
 History of Printing – Timeline

 
Documents
Textual scholarship